
Lake Ter is a small lake at Le Lieu, in the Vallée de Joux of the canton of Vaud, Switzerland.

Lakes of Switzerland
Lakes of the canton of Vaud